Parr Hill Lake, is a lake in the east-central part of the Canadian province of Saskatchewan in the boreal forest ecozone of Canada. It is part of the Swan River drainage basin and is situated in the Porcupine Hills and Saskatchewan's Porcupine Provincial Forest. A block of Porcupine Hills Provincial Park is on the north-eastern shore of the lake. The lake and park are accessed from Highway 982, which is also known as Little Swan Road.

Parr Hill Lake sits in a glacier-formed valley in the Porcupine Hills and is fed by several small rivers and the surrounding muskeg. It is connected to Swan River via a short river that flows out of the south end of the lake. To the north of the lake, and in the same valley, is Pepaw Lake. While the lakes are in  different river systems–Pepaw Lake flows north into Pepaw River and Parr Hill Lake flows south into Swan River–only a marshy portage separates the lakes.

Parks and recreation 
Along the north-eastern shore of the lake is Parr Hill Lake Recreation Site, which is part of Porcupine Hills Provincial Park. It was a stand-alone park until 2018 when it and four other nearby recreation sites were amalgamated in the creation of Saskatchewan's newest provincial park, Porcupine Hills. The site features a campground with 12 campsites, a picnic area, dock, fish cleaning station, and lake access.

Fish species 
Fish commonly found in the lake include northern pike and yellow perch.

See also 
List of lakes of Saskatchewan
List of protected areas of Saskatchewan
Tourism in Saskatchewan
Hudson Bay drainage basin

References 

Lakes of Saskatchewan
Hudson Bay No. 394, Saskatchewan